Sivasangari Subramaniam (born 24 January 1999, in Sungai Petani) is a Malaysian professional squash player. As of May 2022, she was ranked number 20 in the world. She became the 2018 British Junior Open Champion by defeating Satomi Watanabe.

Personal life
Sivasangari was born in Sungai Petani, Kedah to Valli Nagappan and Subramaniam Kaniappan. She started playing squash at the age of eight. She is a former student of SMK Sultanah Asma and obtained her GCE Ordinary Level from Kolej Tuanku Ja'afar. She is currently studying Bachelor of Science (Mass Communications/ Media Studies) at Cornell University. 

On 26 June 2022, she involved in a car accident along the Maju Expressway. She sustained severe injuries to her head and was rushed to the Putrajaya Hospital for treatment. Due to the injury, she had to pull out from competing in the 2022 Commonwealth Games.

Career
In 2011, she was nominated as MSSM (National Schools Sports Council) 2011 Promising Sportsgirl of the Year. 

On July 8, 2018, she became youngest women National Champion by defeating Low Wee Wern in final Ohana 34th National Squash Championships.

On March 6, 2022, she won College Squash Association (CSA) National Collegiate Individual Championships to clinch her first individual title for Cornell University.

See also 
 Official Women's Squash World Ranking

References

1999 births
Living people
Malaysian female squash players
Squash players at the 2018 Commonwealth Games
Commonwealth Games competitors for Malaysia
Asian Games medalists in squash
Squash players at the 2018 Asian Games
Asian Games silver medalists for Malaysia
Asian Games bronze medalists for Malaysia
Medalists at the 2018 Asian Games
Southeast Asian Games gold medalists for Malaysia
Southeast Asian Games medalists in squash
Competitors at the 2017 Southeast Asian Games
21st-century Malaysian women